The 2020 Newfoundland and Labrador Tankard, the men's provincial curling championship for Newfoundland and Labrador, was held from January 28 to February 2 at the RE/MAX Centre in St. John's. The winning Brad Gushue rink will represent Newfoundland and Labrador at the 2020 Tim Hortons Brier, Canada's national men's curling championship in Kingston, Ontario.

Brad Gushue won his fifteenth Newfoundland and Labrador Tankard with a 3–1 victory over Trent Skanes in the final.

Teams
Two-time Brier champion Brad Gushue returned after missing the previous two Tankards as his team automatically qualified for the Brier as "Team Canada" as defending champions. 

Teams are as follows:

Round-robin standings
Final round-robin standings

Round-robin results
All draws are listed in Newfoundland Time (UTC−03:30).

Draw 1
Tuesday, January 28, 11:00 am

Draw 2
Tuesday, January 28, 4:00 pm

Draw 3
Wednesday, January 29, 2:30 pm

Draw 4
Wednesday, January 29, 7:30 pm

Draw 5
Thursday, January 30, 2:30 pm

Draw 6
Thursday, January 30, 7:30 pm

Draw 7
Friday, January 31, 2:30 pm

Draw 8
Friday, January 31, 7:30 pm

Draw 9
Saturday, February 1, 9:30 am

Tiebreakers
Saturday, February 1, 2:30 pm

Saturday, February 1, 7:30 pm

Playoffs

Semifinal
Sunday, February 2, 8:00 am

Final
Sunday, February 2, 1:00 pm

References

External links
Scores

2020 Tim Hortons Brier
Tankard, 2020
Tankard, 2020
Tankard, 2020
January 2020 sports events in Canada
February 2020 sports events in Canada